Amelia Denis de Icaza is a corregimiento in San Miguelito District, Panamá Province, Panama with a population of 38,397 as of 2010. Its population as of 1990 was 33,901; its population as of 2000 was 38,522.

References

Corregimientos of Panamá Province
San Miguelito District